Magsi is a tribe and a surname mainly in Balochistan and Sindh provinces of Pakistan.

Notable people with the surname 
Abdullah Magsi, Pakistani author
Khalid Hussain Magsi, Pakistani politician
Maham Tariq, Pakistani cricketer
Mir Aamir Ali Khan Magsi, Pakistani politician
Mir Nadir Ali Khan Magsi, Pakistani Politician
Nawabzada Saifullah Magsi, Pakistani politician
Nawabzada Tariq Magsi, Pakistani politician
Qadir Magsi (born 1962), Pakistani politician
Rahila Magsi, Pakistani politician
Sardar Qaisar Abbas Khan Magsi, Pakistani politician
Shama Parveen Magsi (born 1950), Pakistani politician
Yousaf Aziz Magsi (1908–1935), Baloch leader from the present-day Balochistan province of Pakistan
Zulfikar Ali Magsi (born 1954), Pakistani politician, Governor of Balochistan, Pakistan

References

Baloch tribes
Ethnic groups in Pakistan
Pakistani names